The 2013 Horizon League baseball tournament was held from May 22 through 25.  All five of the league's teams met in the double-elimination tournament held at Youngstown State University's Eastwood Field.   won their second tournament championship and earned the conference's automatic bid to the 2013 NCAA Division I baseball tournament.

Seeding and format
The league's five teams were seeded one through five based on winning percentage, using conference games only.  They then played a double-elimination tournament.

Bracket

All-Tournament Team
The following players were named to the All-Tournament Team.

Most Valuable Player
Karch Kowalczyk was named Tournament Most Valuable Players.  Kowalczyk was a pitcher for Valparaiso.

References

Horizon League Baseball Tournament
Tournament
Horizon League baseball tournament
College baseball tournaments in Ohio
Sports in Youngstown, Ohio